Mount Ronca is a mountain over 2,200 m, surmounting the south end of Quest Cliffs in the Geologists Range. Mapped by the United States Geological Survey (USGS) from tellurometer surveys and Navy air photos, 1960–62. Named by Advisory Committee on Antarctic Names (US-ACAN) for Luciano B. Ronca, United States Antarctic Research Program (USARP) Italian-American geologist at McMurdo Station, 1960–61.
 

Mountains of Oates Land